Alison Riske was the defending champion but lost to Yulia Putintseva in the second round.

Monica Niculescu won the title, defeating Putintseva in the final, 6–2, 6–3.

Seeds

Main draw

Finals

Top half

Bottom half

References 
 Main draw
 Qualifying draw

Open GDF Suez Nantes Atlantique - Singles